Ken, Kenny or Kenneth Robinson may refer to:

Political figures
Kenneth Robinson (British politician) (1911–1996), British Labour politician
J. Kenneth Robinson (1916–1990), U.S. Representative from Virginia
Ken Robinson (Canadian politician) (1927–1991), Canadian lawyer, barrister and Liberal Member of Parliament
Ken Robinson (Northern Ireland politician) (born 1942), Northern Ireland Unionist politician

Others
Ken Robinson (field hockey) (born 1971), retired field hockey player from New Zealand
Kenneth N. Robinson, member of the First Presidency of the Community of Christ
Kenneth Robinson (cricketer) (1897–1963), English cricketer and Royal Navy officer
Kenneth Robinson (broadcaster) (1925-1994), English radio broadcaster
Kenneth Robinson (historian), British civil servant and academic 
Ken Robinson (priest) (1936–2020), Anglican priest
Ken Robinson (computer scientist) (1938–2020), Australian computer scientist
Ken Robinson (educationalist) (1950–2020), author, speaker, and international advisor on education
Ken Robinson (athlete) (born 1963), American former sprinter
Kenny Robinson (American football) (born 1999), American football safety
Kenny Robinson (comedian), Canadian stand-up comic, actor, and DJ
Kenny Robinson (baseball) (1969–1999), American pitcher in Major League Baseball

See also
Robinson (name)